Julie Finne-Ipsen (born 22 January 1995) is a Danish badminton player from the Værløse club. Finne-Ipsen also plays golf for the Danish national team. She started her badminton career at the Ballerup club at aged six. In 2013, she won silver medal in girls' doubles event and bronze medal in mixed doubles event at the European Junior Badminton Championships.

Achievements

European Junior Championships 
Girls' doubles

Mixed doubles

BWF International Challenge/Series (7 titles, 11 runners-up) 
Women's doubles

  BWF International Challenge tournament
  BWF International Series tournament
  BWF Future Series tournament

References

External links 
 

1995 births
Living people
People from Ballerup
Danish female badminton players
Danish female golfers
Sportspeople from the Capital Region of Denmark
21st-century Danish women